Cammy R. Abernathy is a materials scientist who is the current dean of the University of Florida's Herbert Wertheim College of Engineering.

Education
Abernathy graduated from the Massachusetts Institute of Technology in 1980 followed by MS and PhD degrees from Stanford University.  She received all three of her degrees in materials science and engineering.

Recognition
Abernathy was recognized as a Fellow of the American Physical Society in 2009 "for contributions to the development of compound semiconductor materials growth using molecular beam epitaxy".
She is also a fellow of the American Vacuum Society.

In 2016, the Association for Academic Women at the University of Florida honored Dean Abernathy as its 2016 Woman of Distinction for her leadership and commitment to diversity and inclusion.

References

Living people
University of Florida faculty
MIT School of Engineering alumni
Stanford University School of Engineering alumni
Year of birth missing (living people)
Place of birth missing (living people)
American materials scientists
Women materials scientists and engineers
Fellows of the American Physical Society